It was estimated that more than 370 women were killed between 1993 and 2005 in Ciudad Juárez, a city in northern Mexico. The murders of women and girls received international attention primarily due to perceived government inaction in preventing the violence and bringing perpetrators to justice. The issue has featured in many dramas, songs, books, and so on.

After surveying 155 killings out of 340 documented between 1993 and 2003, a government committee found that roughly half were prompted by motives like robbery and gang wars, while a little more than a third involved sexual assault.

A narcofosa (mass grave attributed to organized crime) containing the remains of women killed in 2011 and 2012 was found in Madera Municipality, Chihuahua, in December 2016.

Homicide statistics
In 2005 Amnesty International said that more than 370 young women and girls had been killed in the cities of Ciudad Juárez and Chihuahua since 1993. In August 2011, it was reported that 130 killings occurred in Ciudad Juárez since January of that year.

A study was conducted in 2008 on the Femicide Database 1993–2007 at the Colegio de la Frontera Norte which documented incidents of femicide that occurred in Ciudad Juárez from 1993–2010. Of the various different kinds of murders that were analyzed, the study found two common patterns in the data which were classified as intimate femicide and systemic sexual femicide.  Intimate femicide refers to women who were killed by men that were close to them. According to the study, intimate femicide accounted for 30.4% of the murders of women and girls in Juárez from 1993–2007. Systematic sexual femicide refers to systematic patterns in the killing of women and children including kidnapping, sexual violence, torture, and body abandonment in areas such as desert areas, garbage dumps, and sewage ditches among others. According to the study, systemic sexual femicide accounted for 31.8% of the murders of women in Juárez from 1993–2007.

According to Molly Molloy, a professor at New Mexico State University, the situation in Juárez is one of "impunity regardless of gender". She states that "female murder victims have never comprised more than 18 percent of the overall number of murder victims in Ciudad Juárez, and in the last two decades that figure averages at less than 10 percent. That’s less than in the United States, where about 20 to 25 percent of the people who are murdered in a given year are women".

Other scholars also state that femicide rates in Ciudad Juárez are lower than in American cities such as Houston and Ensenada, and as a share of overall homicide rates they are typically lower than in other cities.

Contributing factors

Organized crime and drug trafficking

Drug cartels operate in Juárez, which has resulted in high levels of violence against the local population, including women and girls.

Misogyny is a common trait of gang activity. According to a study conducted in 2008, 9.1% of the murders of women were attributed to organized crime and drug trafficking activities.

Maquila industry
Maquiladoras are widely known for their cheap labor and their exploitative conditions, such as regularly violating basic human rights, that often target women. Women and girls often migrate from villages or rural areas in other parts of Mexico in search of work in the maquilas. According to Livingston, this migration of women created, "a new phenomenon of mobile, independent, and vulnerable working women," in cities like Ciudad Juárez. Many of the murder victims in Ciudad Juárez have been maquiladora employees. Despite the expansion of the maquila industry, Juárez still remained a relatively poor and undeveloped city lacking infrastructure in some parts such as electricity and paved roads. As a part of their daily commute, many women maquila workers walk through such areas to and from company buses creating vulnerability to be victimized. In addition, the increased involvement of women in the labor force may also be a contributing factor to the victimization of women and girls because of the competition for economic resources in decades in which male unemployment has been high.

NAFTA
The implementation of the North American Free Trade Agreement in 1994 resulted in the expansion of the maquiladora industry and created new opportunities for employment for women outside of the home and in the factories. The availability of cheap labor made it attractive for business owners to open factories in Mexico, and the availability of cheap employment attracted many, especially women, to border towns such as Ciudad Juárez. Research has shown correlations between economic and political issues and violence against women along the border.

Academic Katherine Pantaleo has argued that "NAFTA, as a capitalist approach, has directly created a devaluation of women and an increase in gendered violence." Further, according to Wright, in the time period between the implementation of NAFTA in 1994 and 2001, "the homicide rate for men increased by 300 percent, while for women it increased by 600 percent."  Such studies indicate the importance of exploring the effects of NAFTA when considering the possible causes of the murder of women and girls in Ciudad Juárez. Consequently, it has been suggested that amendments be made to NAFTA that include human rights provisions.

Gender roles
Sociocultural attitudes to traditional gender roles have influenced violence against women. According to Pantaleo, "Under the view of patriarchy, two expressions are commonly used in Mexico to show the difference in the status of males and females; these expressions are machismo and marianismo." Machismo is characterized by male power and aggression; while marianismo is characterized by subordination and domestic duties. Women who leave their homes to seek employment in the maquila industry directly challenge the marianismo. Olivera suggests that this changed situation challenges hypermasculinity. According to Livingston, gender-directed violence in Ciudad Juárez may be a negative reaction as women "gain greater personal autonomy and independence while men lose ground."

Police and governmental response 
The murder of women in Juárez has attracted global attention since 1993 given suspected police and government inaction to prevent the murders and bring perpetrators to justice. Police and government officials have been accused of responding with indifference to the crimes against women as well as exhibiting tolerance for such crimes, conducting inadequate and negligent investigations, ineffectively responding to the crimes, and failing to prevent and protect women from violence. According to Livingston, "In 1998 the National Commission for Human Rights issued a report charging gross irregularities and general negligence in state investigations, including the misidentification of corpses, failure to obtain expert tests on forensic evidence, failure to conduct autopsies or obtain semen analysis...  failure to file written reports, [and] incompetence in keeping records of the rising tide of women murders."

As a result of international attention, police and government officials have been politically pressured to respond to the murders. In 2011, Amnesty International said, "The government [has] failed to take effective measures to investigate and bring to justice those responsible for the abduction and killing of three women in Ciudad Juárez... or to combat the ongoing pattern of violence against women and discrimination in the city.

Convictions
According to Pantaleo in 2006, "While around 400 girls and women have been abducted and murdered, few arrests and convictions have resulted." For convictions that have been made, there is a great deal of controversy that surrounds them.  Police have been accused of conducting rushed investigations with questionable methodology and integrity. Further, suspects that have been apprehended have claimed that they were tortured into confessing. This has caused uncertainty of the legitimacy of both investigations and convictions.

In 1996, an Egyptian, Abdul Latif Sharif, was convicted of 3 murders and sentenced to a 30-year prison term.  After his arrest in 1995, the murders continued and authorities claimed that Sharif directed members of the "Los Rebeldes" gang to continue the murders while he was incarcerated. These members were indicted and convicted as a result of this connection. The gang members accused of carrying out murders under Sharif's orders claimed they were tortured while in police custody. According to Monarrez Fragoso, "In the year 2000, it was known that the body of Elizabeth Castro Garcia, whose murder was attributed to Omar Sharif Latif, does not belong to her."

In 2001, Victor Garcia Uribe and Gustavo Gonzalez Meza were apprehended for eight murders. Gustavo Gonzalez Mesa died suspiciously while in police custody. In 2004, Victor Garcia Uribe, a bus driver, was convicted of eight murders that took place in 2001. He confessed to these murders, but claimed that he was tortured into confessing by police.

In 2008, 16-year-old Ruby Frayre Escobedo was murdered by Sergio Barraza Bocanegra who was acquitted at his first trial for lack of evidence. Following two years of activism, a retrial convicted Bocanegra, who remained on the run. In 2010, Ruby's mother, Marisela Escobedo Ortiz, was assassinated by a shot to the head at point blank range while demonstrating for justice in front of the Governor's Palace in Chihuahua.

International justice
There have been several international rulings against Mexico for its inadequate response to the increasing violence against women. In 2004, under the Optional Protocol to the Convention on the Elimination of All Forms of Discrimination against Women (CEDAW) conducted an inquiry into the allegations that hundreds of murders of women and girls had taken place in the area of Ciudad Juarez since 1993 at the urging of several NGOs. In order for the inquiry to take place it was required that there was reliable evidence that showed that Mexico was in violation of rights established by CEDAW. The Committee analyzed the gender-based crimes occurring in Ciudad Juárez and found the two common forms were murder and disappearances. The Committee also analyzed the response of the government and found that their initial response was indifference and that the government exhibited tolerance of these crimes for years.

Further, the Committee concluded that the measures undertaken by the Mexican government in response to gendered violence against women leading up to the time of their inquiry were, "few and ineffective at all levels of the State". The Committee made several recommendations for Mexico to adhere to. Although these recommendations were not legally binding, they were influential in the public sphere.

According to Amnesty International, "In [2009], the Inter-American Court of Human Rights ruled on the “cotton field” (Campo Algodonero) case that Mexico was guilty of discrimination and of failing to protect three young women murdered in 2001 in Ciudad Juárez or to ensure an effective investigation into their abduction and murder." The Court ordered Mexico to conduct a new investigation of the murders, create a national memorial for the victims, pay reparations to the families of the victims, and to improve measures which prevent and adequately investigate the murder of women and girls.

Local activism

There have been numerous local efforts that have helped draw attention to the femicides in Juárez. In 1999, a group of feminist activists founded Casa Amiga, Juárez's first rape crisis and sexual assault center. The center works to provide women in Juárez with a refuge against violence, therapy, legal council, and medical attention. In 2002, a social justice movement named Ni Una Mas, which in Spanish means "not one more," was formed to raise international awareness to violence against women in Juárez. The movement consists of a variety of domestic and international organizations and individual activists. Ni Una Mas participants demand that the Mexican state implement strategies that prevent violence against women including murder and kidnappings and that the state conduct competent investigations on crimes already committed. Nuestras Hijas de Regreso a Casa A.C., which in Spanish means "Our Daughters Back Home" also formed in response to the violence against women in Juárez. Nuestras Hijas de Regreso a Casa A.C. has also worked to bring domestic and international media attention to the violence against women in Juárez.

Cultural references

In television and radio
 The American television series The Bridge (2013) used the disappearance of the girls of Juárez as part of the backdrop to a series of murders.
 This American Life (Public Radio Exchange), Episode 506 - Secret Identity, Act Three: The Blonde Avenger, about a real life avenger with a secret identity against sexual violence from bus drivers in Ciudad Juarez, Mexico.  October 4, 2013. Podcast with transcript.
 The Netflix series "Narcos: Mexico" Season 3 references the murders of the young women working in the maquiladoras as a subplot.

In film
The documentary Blood Rising (2013) directed by Mark McLoughlin, which examines the phenomenon of femicide in Juárez through the work of an artist, Brian Maguire.
The film Backyard: El Traspatio (2009), directed by Carlos Carrera, is based on these events.
The film Bordertown (2007), starring Jennifer Lopez and Antonio Banderas, is based on these murders.
The film Señorita Extraviada/Missing Young Woman (2001) by Lourdes Portillo, is a documentary following the femicides of Juárez.
The documentary film Equal Means Equal (2016) directed by Kamala Lopez features a segment on the women of Juárez.
The documentary film Bajo Juárez: La Ciudad Devorando a Sus Hijas (2006) directed by José Antonio Cordero and Alejandra Sánchez hints at the many layers of political collusion and indifference from local, state and federal authorities.
The documentary Las tres muertes de Marisela Escobedo (2020) directed by Carlos Pérez Osorio looks the story of a woman in the midst of a tireless struggle to achieve justice and prevent her daughter's femicide from being forgotten in impunity.
The documentary Flowers of the Desert: Stories from the Red Note (2021) directed by Estefanía Bonilla Hernández and produced by Craig Whitney, looks at the murder and disappearance of women along the border in Ciudad Juarez for the last 25 years, exploring the web of corruption, drug violence and sex trafficking at the root of the crimes.

In music
Tori Amos wrote a song about these incidents titled "Juárez", for her album To Venus and Back (1999-2000), after reading about them.
At the Drive-In's song "Invalid Litter Dept." (2001) contains lyrics about the murders.
Los Tigres del Norte's song "Mujeres de Juárez" discusses the lack of government action in finding the perpetrators.
 The Misfits wrote a song about Juárez titled "Where Do They Go?" from their 2011 album The Devil's Rain. In the lyrics, the incidents are referred to as femicides.
 Gloria Trevi's song "Inmaculada" from her 2007 album Una Rosa Blu was inspired by the murders.
 The World Is a Beautiful Place & I Am No Longer Afraid to Die's song "January 10th, 2014" is about the murders and the vigilante justice that took place in their aftermath.
Intocable's song Día 730 has an example that links it to one girl who was going to become famous, but instead became one of the victims for femicide.
Sheer Mag's song "Can't Stop Fighting," from their third EP, references the phenomenon in its first lines.
Misty L. Dupuis wrote a choral work in honor of the missing and murdered women of Juárez called Mujeres de Juárez.

In print
In Roberto Bolaño's novel, 2666 (2004), the murders serve as inspiration for a major section entitled "The Part about the Crimes", although the novel is actually set in "Santa Teresa", a fictionalized version of Ciudad Juárez.
Alicia Gaspar de Alba's mystery novel, Desert Blood (2005), addresses this topic.
 "Each and Her" (2010) by Valerie Martinez is a book-length poem that addresses the murders in the context of politics, gender oppression, mythology, art, and more.
 "If I Die In Juárez" (2008) by Stella Pope Duarte
 In Eve Ensler's Vagina Monologues, female homicides in Juárez feature in the monologue "Memory of Her Face".
 "Señorita X - Song for the Yellow-Robed Girl from Juárez" (2007) by Juan Felipe Herrera
 "The Daughters of Juárez: A True Story of Serial Murder South of the Border" (2007) by Teresa Rodríguez
The Way She Spoke by Isaac Gomez
 The Killing Fields: Harvest of Women by Diana Washington Valdez
 Suffering and Salvation in Ciudad Juarez by Nancy Pineda-Madrid reads the feminicide theologically and makes advances on the Catholic soteriology
 Iphigenia Crash Land Falls on the Neon Shell That Was Once Her Heart (a rave fable) by Caridad Svich contains a chorus of murdered girls and directly references Juárez several times.

See also 
 Femicide in Latin America
 Human rights in Mexico
 List of unsolved murders
 Not My Fault: Mexico
 Women in Mexico

References

1993 murders in Mexico
1990s murders in Mexico
2005 murders in Mexico
2000s murders in Mexico
20th-century mass murder in Mexico
21st-century mass murder in Mexico
Ciudad Juárez
Female murder victims
Incidents of violence against women
Murder in Mexico
Rape in Mexico
Unidentified serial killers
Unsolved murders in Mexico
Violence against women in Mexico
Femicide in Mexico